Macroscaphites is an extinct cephalopod genus included in the Ammonoidea that lived during the Barremian and Aptian stages of the Early Cretaceous (118 - 110 million years ago). Its fossils have been found throughout most of Europe and North Africa.

The shell is in two basic parts, an early planispirally coiled evolute section followed by a more or less straight section that turns back on itself in a hook.

On the basis of studies conducted on the shape of the shell (which take into account the specific weight of the live animal and respective position of the centers of gravity and buoyancy) paleontologists have concluded that this animal lived with the aperture directed toward the surface of the water; the coiled portion upward and the U-shaped-hook directed towards the ocean floor.

List of species 

 Macroscaphites juani (Puzos 1832) ; Cuba
 Macroscaphites soaresi (Da Silva 1962) ; Mozambique
 Macroscaphites striasulcatus 
 Macroscaphites tirolensis (Uhlig, 1887) ; South Tyrol, Italy

Fossil locations 
Fossils of Macroscaphites have been found in:

Eurasia
 Bulgaria
 Luckovska Formation, the Czech Republic
 France
 Georgia
 Italy
 Serbia and Montenegro
 Forcall Formation, Spain

Laurentia
 Mexico

Africa
 Egypt
 Mozambique
 Makatini Formation, South Africa

South America
 García Formation, Venezuela

References

Bibliography 

 William James Kennedy, Herbert Christian Klinger, Mikheil V. Kakabadze, « Macroscaphites Meek, 1876, a heteromorph ammonite from the Lower Aptian of southern Mozambique and northern KwaZulu-Natal », African Natural History, vol.5, p. 37-41.
 A. Cantu-Chapa, « Présence de Macroscaphites, Ammonite du Crétacé inférieur de Oaxaca (sud du Mexique) », Revista Mexicana de Ciencias Geológicas, vol.15, n°1 (1998), p. 106-108.
 G. Delanoy, J. A. Moreno-Bedmar, J.J. Ruiz and D. Tolós Lládser. 2013. Xerticeras gen. nov., a new genus of micromorphic heteromorph ammonite (Ancyloceratina, Ancyloceratidae)from the lower Aptian of Spain. Carnets de Géologie [Notebooks on Geology] CG2013_A02:89-103
 O. Renz. 1982. The Cretaceous ammonites of Venezuela 1-132

Cretaceous ammonites
Barremian genus first appearances
Aptian life
Albian life
Cenomanian life
Turonian genus extinctions
Ammonites of Africa
Cretaceous animals of Africa
Fossils of Egypt
Fossils of Mozambique
Fossils of South Africa
Cretaceous ammonites of Europe
Fossils of the Czech Republic
Fossils of France
Fossils of Georgia (country)
Fossils of Italy
Fossils of Serbia
Fossils of Spain
Cretaceous ammonites of North America
Fossils of Mexico
Ammonites of South America
Cretaceous animals of South America
Fossils of Venezuela
Fossil taxa described in 1876